The Cessna Model A is a 1920s American high-wing four-seat tourer built by the Cessna Aircraft Company, the first in a long line of high-wing single-engined monoplanes.

Design and development
The first Cessna design built in any numbers was the Cessna Model A, a four-seater with a mixed wood and steel-tube construction with fabric covering. The aircraft was built in a number of variants fitted with different engines.

The prototype (Model AC) first flew in 1927 and the first production aircraft appeared in the following year.

Variants
Model AA
Fitted with a 120 hp (89 kW) Anzani 10 engine, 14 built.
Model AC
Fitted with a 130 hp (97 kW) Comet 7-RA engine, one built.
Model AF
Fitted with a 150 hp (112 kW) Floco/Axelson engine, three built.
Model AS
Fitted with a 125 hp (93 kW) Siemens-Halske engine, four built.
Model AW
Fitted with a 125 hp (93 kW) Warner Scarab engine, 48 built. One was purchased by Eddie August Schneider in which he set three transcontinental airspeed records for pilots under the age of twenty-one in 1930.
Model BW
A three-seat version with a 220 hp (164 kW) Wright J-5 engine, 13 built.

Specifications (Cessna AA)

References

Further reading

A
High-wing aircraft
Single-engined tractor aircraft
1920s United States civil utility aircraft
Aircraft first flown in 1927